The Comet Strikes is a 1971 Hong Kong action horror film directed by Lo Wei for Golden Harvest.

Plot

During a time of strife in his court, a king and some loyal ministers hide in an old house rumored to be haunted, its previous tenants, Mr. and Mrs. Tse, having supposedly died there mysteriously. Their son, Tse Tin Jun, also travels to the house to find out the truth about his parents’ death. When one of the ministers behind the revolt discovers the king's hiding place, he sends a military force to kill the king. It is revealed that Mr. and Mrs. Tse staged their deaths to deceive the public and they, along with their son, stand with the king and his party to fight against the rebels.

Cast
Nora Miao 
Patrick Tse Yin
Lo Wei
Stanley Fung 
Anthony Lau
Lee Kwan
Sek Kin
Feng Yi
Hung Lau
Chiang Nan
Sammo Hung
Jason Pai
Eddy Ko

External links
 The Comet Strikes at HKcinemamagic.com
 

1971 films
Hong Kong horror films
1970s action horror films
1971 horror films
1970s Mandarin-language films
Golden Harvest films
1970s Hong Kong films